Ganei Am (lit. People Gardens) is a moshav in central Israel. Located in the Sharon plain near Hod HaSharon and covering 350 dunams, it falls under the jurisdiction of Drom HaSharon Regional Council.

History
The moshav was founded in 1932 by Jewish immigrants from Germany who were members of the HaOved HaTzioni group. It is no longer agricultural, and is only a residential village.

References

German-Jewish culture in Israel
Moshavim
Populated places established in 1932
Populated places in Central District (Israel)
1932 establishments in Mandatory Palestine